Reinhardt Kiehl (born 31 May 1935 in Herne, North Rhine-Westphalia) is a German mathematician.

From 1955, Kiehl studied mathematics, physics and astronomy at the University of Göttingen and the University of Heidelberg. He received in 1965 his Ph.D. (promotion) under Friedrich Karl Schmidt at Heidelberg University with thesis Äquivalenzrelationen in analytischen Räumen. He was from 1966 to 1968 a research assistant and in 1968–1969 a docent at the University of Münster, where he received in 1968 his habilitation. From 1969 to 1972 he was a professor ordinarius at the Goethe-Universität Frankfurt am Main. From 1972 he was a professor ordinarius at the University of Mannheim, where he retired in 2003 as professor emeritus.

His research deals with algebraic and arithmetic geometry and non-archimedean function theory. He wrote with Eberhard Freitag a textbook on the Weil conjectures and étale cohomology. In 1970 Kiehl was an Invited Speaker at the ICM in Nice with talk Grauertsche Kohärenzsätze für stetige und differenzierbare Familien komplexer Räume.

Selected publications
with Eberhard Freitag: Etale Cohomology and the Weil Conjecture, Springer Verlag 1988
with Rainer Weissauer: Weil Conjectures, Perverse Sheaves and ℓ-adic Fourier Transform, Springer Verlag 2001
De Rham Kohomologie algebraischer Mannigfaltigkeiten über einem bewerteten Körper, Pub. Math. IHES, vol. 33, 1967, pp. 5–20, Online
 Der Endlichkeitssatz für eigentliche Abbildungen in der nichtarchimedischen Funktionentheorie, Inventiones Mathematicae, vol. 2, 1967, pp. 191–214
Theorem A und B in der nichtarchimedischen Funktionentheorie, Inventiones Mathematicae, vol. 2, 1967, pp. 256–273
Ausgezeichnete Ringe in der nichtarchimedischen analytischen Geometrie, J. Reine Angewandte Mathematik, vol. 235, 1969, p. 89
mit Jean-Louis Verdier Ein einfacher Beweis des Kohärenzsatzes von Grauert, Mathematische Annalen, Band 195, 1971, pp. 24–50
Äquivalenzrelationen in analytischen Räumen, Mathematische Zeitschrift, vol. 105, 1968, pp. 1–20
 Relativ analytische Räume, Inventiones Mathematicae, vol. 16, 1972, pp. 40–112

References

20th-century German mathematicians
21st-century German mathematicians
Algebraic geometers
People from Herne, North Rhine-Westphalia
Heidelberg University alumni
University of Münster alumni
Academic staff of the University of Mannheim
1935 births
Living people